The Naked Gun : The Smell of Fear is a 1991 American crime comedy film. It is the sequel to the 1988 film The Naked Gun: From the Files of Police Squad! and the second installment in The Naked Gun film series. The film stars Leslie Nielsen as the comically bumbling Police Lt. Frank Drebin of Police Squad!. Priscilla Presley plays the role of Jane, with O. J. Simpson as Nordberg and George Kennedy as police captain Ed Hocken. The film also features Robert Goulet (who previously made a "special guest star" appearance on Police Squad!) as the villainous Quentin Hapsburg and Richard Griffiths as renewable fuel advocate Dr. Albert S. Meinheimer (as well as his evil double, Earl Hacker). Zsa Zsa Gabor, Mel Tormé and members of the Chicago Bears have cameo roles.

David Zucker returns from the first entry as director and screenwriter of the film. Jim Abrahams and Jerry Zucker serve as executive producers for the film and receive writing credit due to their contributions to the first entry of the series and the Police Squad! television series. However, neither contributed to the screenplay for the film.

A third installment in the series, Naked Gun : The Final Insult, was released in 1994.

Plot
At the White House, President George H. W. Bush announces that he will base the country's energy policy on the recommendations of Dr. Albert Meinheimer.  The heads of the coal, oil, and nuclear power industries are upset by the President's decision as Dr. Meinheimer plans to advocate for renewable energy. Jane Spencer, now separated from Frank Drebin, is working late at Dr. Meinheimer's research institute when she spots a suspicious man leaving in a van. A maintenance worker finds a clock with dynamite attached and takes it to the security guards, who accidentally trigger an explosion.

The next morning, Frank is reunited with Jane as he investigates the bombing. He also meets Jane's new boyfriend, Hexagon Oil executive Quentin Hapsburg, and becomes exceedingly jealous. Later that evening, Frank and his boss Ed Hocken meet up at a blues bar.  Jane finds Frank at the bar and they get into an argument that causes Frank to storm out.  Elsewhere, Hapsburg holds a secret meeting of the energy industry leaders where he reveals his plan for changing Dr. Meinheimer's speech. Hapsburg introduces them to Earl Hacker, a dead ringer for Dr. Meinheimer who will take Dr. Meinheimer's place and deliver a speech recommending more fossil fuels.  Dr. Meinheimer is kidnapped by Hapsburg's goons, who tie him up and leave him in a warehouse.

Police Squad tracks down Hector Savage, the man whom Jane saw on the night of the bombing.  Savage leads them on a short chase that ends in a standoff at a nearby house.  While Savage negotiates with the police, Frank drives a SWAT tank through the house and allows Savage to flee.  Frank loses control of the tank and crashes into the city zoo, causing the animals to escape. At a party later that evening, Frank notices that Dr. Meinheimer does not remember meeting him despite having a photographic memory. Frank visits Jane at her apartment after the party and asks if Dr. Meinheimer had been acting strange. After Frank leaves, Savage breaks into Jane's apartment and tries to kill her in the shower.  Frank intervenes and kills Savage. Jane realizes she still loves Frank and the two rekindle their romance.

The next day, Police Squad stakes out the warehouse where Dr. Meinheimer is being held captive.  Frank tries to sneak into the building but is captured and tied up with Dr. Meinheimer.  They are freed by Police Squad and head to the Press Club Dinner to stop Hacker. Jane agrees to open a locked door to let them in, but she is interrupted by Hapsburg.  Frank, Ed, Nordberg, and Dr. Meinheimer steal a mariachi band's costumes and sneak inside.  Ed captures Hacker and gets a confession from him, causing Hapsburg to take Jane hostage and flee the dinner.  Frank pursues Hapsburg to the roof where he learns that Hapsburg has rigged up a small nuclear device which will kill everyone in the building. Frank catches Hapsburg and attempts to learn the bomb's disarming code but Ed throws Hapsburg out a window. Miraculously, Hapsburg bounces off an awning and lands on the sidewalk unscathed, only to be killed by an escaped lion from the zoo.

Frank and Jane try to disarm the bomb while Ed and Nordberg go back into the ballroom to evacuate it.  Frank finally disarms the bomb at the last second by tripping over and unplugging the power cord. Frank is commended by the President, who offers him a special post as head of a new Federal Bureau of Police Squad. Frank declines and instead proposes marriage to Jane, which she accepts.

Cast

 Leslie Nielsen as Lieutenant Frank Drebin of Police Squad.  Drebin is investigating the bombing of a building which leads him back to his former lover Jane and her new boyfriend Quentin Hapsburg.
 Priscilla Presley as Jane Spencer, Frank's love interest from the previous movie.  She becomes torn between her feelings for Frank and her beau Quentin Hapsburg.
 George Kennedy as Captain Ed Hocken, Frank's supervisor at Police Squad.
 O. J. Simpson as Detective Nordberg, Frank's bumbling partner.
 Robert Goulet as Quentin Hapsburg, owner of Hexagon Oil and the main antagonist.  He plans to replace Dr. Meinheimer with a duplicate who will recommend that the U.S. remain dependent on fossil fuels and nuclear power instead of switching to renewable energy.
 Richard Griffiths as Dr. Albert S. Meinheimer and Earl Hacker.  Dr. Meinheimer is selected by the President to plan a new energy policy for the United States, while Hacker is a duplicate of Dr. Meinheimer hired to impersonate him and deliver a different policy.  
 Jacqueline Brookes as Commissioner Anabell Brumford
 Anthony James as Hector Savage, a goon working for Quentin Hapsburg.
 Lloyd Bochner as Terence Baggett, head of the Society of Petroleum Industry Leaders (SPIL).
 Tim O'Connor as Donald Fenswick, Chairman of the Society for More Coal Energy (SMOKE).
 Peter Mark Richman as Arthur Dunwell, Chairman of the Key Atomic Benefits Office of Mankind (KABOOM).
 Ed Williams as Ted Olsen, an unusually tall member of Police Squad.
 John Roarke as President George H. W. Bush
 Margery Ross as First Lady Barbara Bush
 Peter Van Norden as Chief of Staff John Sununu
 "Weird Al" Yankovic as Police station thug
 Gina Mastrogiacomo as Sex shop worker

Music
As with the first Naked Gun film, the original music for the second installment was composed and orchestrated by veteran soundtrack composer Ira Newborn, including the familiar big-band/blues theme for the Naked Gun/Police Squad! franchise.

Several of the orchestral movements revolve around two other Newborn pieces: "Drebin - Hero!" (used at the top of the pre-credit sequence, from the Paramount-logo animation onward) and the romantic "Thinking of Him" (immediately after the credits).

Seasoned Broadway and film singer/actress Colleen Fitzpatrick plays a saloon singer at a sad-sack restaurant called the Blue Note, to which a depressed Detective Lieutenant Drebin repairs after seeing his former girlfriend Jane Spencer being wooed by the villain Quentin Hapsburg. This role has frequently been attributed to singer Vitamin C who happens to share the same name, but this is incorrect.

Other non-Newborn pieces are heard in this Naked Gun installment. They include the standards "Tangerine" and "Satin Doll" and The Righteous Brothers' recordings of "Unchained Melody" (featured in Jerry Zucker's drama Ghost) and "Ebb Tide." Nielsen himself voices the Latin-flavored pop standard "Bésame Mucho" at the Press Club dinner.

Soundtrack

In conjunction with the second Naked Gun film, Varèse Sarabande released a soundtrack combining the best Newborn compositions from the first two films. The full scores for The Naked Gun trilogy, along with source music and alternate cues as bonus material, was released in 2014 by La-La-Land Records.

Reception

Box office
The Naked Gun : The Smell of Fear knocked Robin Hood: Prince of Thieves from the top spot at the box office. It grossed $86.9 million in the United States and Canada and did even better internationally, grossing $105 million for a worldwide total of $192 million against a reported budget of $23 million. It was the 10th best performing movie of 1991 in the United States.

Critical response
On Rotten Tomatoes, the film holds an approval rating of 58% based on 45 reviews, with an average rating of 6/10. The website's critical consensus reads, "Naked Gun : The Smell of Fear delivers a handful of moderate laughs, but overall, its strained antics pale in comparison to its gut-busting predecessor." On Metacritic, the film holds a weighted average score of 65 out of 100, based on 21 critics, indicating "generally favorable reviews".

Owen Gleiberman of Entertainment Weekly awarded it a B+, but observed that in some ways, it was "the most predictable of the ZAZ films. Even the inconsistent Top Secret! (1984), a demented hybrid of Elvis movies and World War II espionage thrillers, had far wilder passages. Yet I'll take lesser ZAZ over most of the competition any day. Their comedies don't just get you laughing. They put you inside a new, cracked-mirror world — a world where no detail is too small for ridicule, and where Leslie Nielsen (bless him) can be a movie star." Kenneth Turan wrote in the Los Angeles Times that one should "consider The Naked Gun : The Smell of Fear. The title is funny enough, so are the credits ("Un Film de David Zucker"), and the key art, showing fearless Lt. Frank Drebin spread-eagled on a pair of speeding bullets, is good for a chuckle as well. But that's where the laughter ends, pal. Because the only thing about The Naked Gun that won't make you laugh is the film itself."

References

External links

 
 
 
 

The Naked Gun
1991 films
1990s parody films
1990s police comedy films
1990s screwball comedy films
American screwball comedy films
American slapstick comedy films
1990s English-language films
Films about the Federal Bureau of Investigation
Films directed by David Zucker (director)
American sequel films
Paramount Pictures films
Films set in Washington, D.C.
Films scored by Ira Newborn
Cultural depictions of George H. W. Bush
Films with screenplays by David Zucker (filmmaker)
Films with screenplays by Pat Proft
1991 comedy films
Films produced by Robert K. Weiss
1990s American films